Granger Smith is an American country music artist. His discography comprises eleven studio albums, one live album, two extended plays and 23  singles.

Albums

Studio albums

Live albums

Extended plays

Singles 

Notes

Other charted and certified songs

Music videos

References 

Country music discographies
Discographies of American artists